Maroc Hebdo is a French-language Moroccan weekly political magazine.

History
Maroc Hebdo was established in 1991 by Mohammed Selhami in Casablanca. Mohammed Selhami also edited it. In January 2005, it changed to the magazine format.

The editorial stance of Maroc Hebdo is pro-government. In 2013 the magazine sold 6,265 copies.

Homophobic controversy
On 12 June 2015, it published an issue with a homophobic cover saying, "Shall we burn homosexuals?". Due to ensuing global outrage at the incitement of hatred, all copies were recalled.

References

External links
 

1991 establishments in Morocco
French-language magazines
Magazines established in 1991
Mass media in Casablanca
Magazines published in Morocco
Political magazines
Weekly magazines